Discovery Claim is a mining claim at Bonanza Creek, a watercourse in the Yukon, Canada. It is the site where, in the afternoon of August 16, 1896, the first piece of gold was found in the Yukon by prospectors. The site is considered to be the place where the Klondike gold rush started. It is located around 17 km south-southeast of Dawson City. The Discovery claim was designated a National Historic Site of Canada on July 13, 1998.

Discovery
On August 16, 1896 George Carmack, an American prospector, his Tagish wife Kate (birthname Shaaw Tláa), her brother Skookum Jim (birthname Keish), and their nephew Dawson Charlie (K̲áa Goox̱), while travelling through the area, stopped to rest on the banks of one of the Klondike River's tributaries called Bonanza Creek, then called Rabbit Creek. They were there on the a suggestion of another prospector Robert Henderson.  One of them noticed a shiny object in the water. It was gold and Carmack took credit for finding it. It is uncertain whether it was George Carmack, Kate Carmack or Skookum Jim who made the discovery, but the group decided that George Carmack be named as the official discoverer out of concern that mining authorities would be reluctant to recognize a claim made by an Indigenous claimant.

Staking
On August 17, 1896, they staked out four claims, the first at Bonanza Creek. Two were for George Carmack. At that time, being the first to discover gold in an area entitled him to stake another, second claim. The other two claims were staked on behalf of Skookum Jim and Dawson Charlie.

Registration
The following month on September 24 they registered the claims. This took place at the police post in Forty Mile 80 km away at the mouth of the Forty Mile River.

The initial claim is described legally as Claim 37903, a 152.4 metre (500 ft.) by 609.6 metre (2,000 ft.) area.

Notes

References

Bibliography

External links

Klondike Gold Rush
National Historic Sites in Yukon
Gold mining in Yukon
1890s in Yukon